Gillian Ruth Brown is a British psychologist and reader in Psychology and Neuroscience at the University of St Andrews.
She is known for her research on the evolutionary approaches to the study of human behavior.
Brown held a Wellcome Trust Career Development Fellowship from 2006 to 2010.

Bibliography
 Sense and nonsense: Evolutionary perspectives on human behaviour, Oxford University Press, 2002, Kevin N. Laland and Gillian R. Brown, 1st edition 
 Sense and nonsense: Evolutionary perspectives on human behaviour, Oxford University Press, 2011, Kevin N. Laland and Gillian R. Brown, 2nd edition

See also
Dual inheritance theory

External links
Faculty page
Lab page

References

Living people
Academics of the University of St Andrews
British psychologists
Evolutionary psychologists
Year of birth missing (living people)